Graduate Talent Pool is a government-backed and funded service allowing graduates from the last three years to search for paid internships advertised by UK businesses.

The service, which launched in 2009, is provided by Graduate Prospects, on behalf of the UK government.

References

External links 

 Official site

Educational charities based in the United Kingdom
Graduate recruitment
Higher education organisations based in the United Kingdom
Internships
Organisations based in Manchester